The Tenerife Ladies Open was a tennis tournament held in Guía de Isora, Tenerife, Spain for female professional tennis players, whose first edition is part of the 2021 WTA Tour. It took place on outdoor hard courts, on Flexi-Pave surface, and during mid-October.

Results

Singles

Doubles

References

Tennis tournaments in Spain